Pervenci, subtitled različne piesme,  is a collection of 35 poems written by Croatian poet Petar Preradović. They ware first published in year 1846 in Zadar.

Book is composed in three sections; Cvietje, Bilje and Presad!.

External links 
  Pervenci

1846 poems
Works by Petar Preradović